Just As I Am is the seventh studio album by Canadian country music artist Paul Brandt. It was released on Brandt's record label, Brand-T Records.  The album is distinct among Brandt's work as it is wholly focused on interpretations of Christian music.

Track listing

References

2012 albums
Paul Brandt albums